The 1877 Tipperary by-election was fought on 15 May 1877.  The byelection was fought due to the death of the incumbent Home Rule MP, William Frederick Ormond O'Callaghan.  It was won by the Home Rule candidate Edmund Dwyer Gray.

References

1877 elections in the United Kingdom
By-elections to the Parliament of the United Kingdom in County Tipperary constituencies
1877 elections in Ireland